The Washington State Scenic and Recreational Highways program is a system of scenic routes in the U.S. state of Washington.

History

The passage of the Scenic and Recreational Highway Act of 1967, signed into law on April 27, 1967, established Washington's state scenic and recreational highway program.

State byways

Agricultural scenic corridors

Former byways

State Route 901 (removed in 1992)

National byways

In addition to the state scenic highways system, several routes in Washington are designated as National Scenic Byways and All-American Roads.

 Cascade Loop National Scenic Byway (2021)
 Chinook Scenic Byway (1998), an All-American Road
 Coulee Corridor Scenic Byway (2005)
 International Selkirk Loop (2005), an All-American Road
 Mountains to Sound Greenway (1998)
 Pacific Coast Scenic Byway (1998), an All-American Road since 2002
 Stevens Pass Greenway (2005)
 Strait of Juan de Fuca Highway (2000)

Notes

References

External links
WSDOT: Scenic Highways Program

Scenic routes